"Made in Japan" is the debut extended play and soundtrack by American singers Bella Thorne and Zendaya. The album was released on August 21, 2012 by  Walt Disney. "Fashion is My Kryptonite" was released as single on July 20, 2012.

Promotion
On August 3, Disney Channel premiere the music video of "Fashion is My Kryptonite". The song was also included in the Walmart exclusive version of Shake It Up: Live 2 Dance soundtrack. On August 4, Thorne and Zendaya were interviewed by Radio Disney and talked about the production of the EP. "Fashion is My Kryptonite", "Made In Japan" and "The Same Heart" was performed during the double episode of Shake It Up, also named Made in Japan. The performances reached 4.5 million views.

Commercial reception
All the songs peaked at Billboard Kid Digital Songs."Fashion is My Kryptonite" reached number two, "Made in Japan" peaked at number three and "The Same Heart" reached number four.

Track listing

Release history

References

Shake It Up (American TV series)
Bella Thorne albums
Zendaya albums
2012 debut EPs
Walt Disney Records EPs